Ivoševci is a village located in the municipality of Kistanje, in the Šibenik-Knin County, Croatia. The village is situated in the region known as Bukovica. The population is 359 (census 2001).

References

External links
 Ivoševci - location map

Populated places in Šibenik-Knin County